Atractaspis duerdeni, commonly known as the beaked burrowing asp, Duerden's burrowing asp, and Duerden's stiletto snake, is a species of venomous snake in the family Atractaspididae. The species is native to southern Africa.

Etymology
The specific epithet, duerdeni, is in honor of James Edwin Duerden (1865–1937) of the Albany Museum, Grahamstown, South Africa.

Geographic range
A. duerdeni is found in southeastern Botswana, Namibia, and northern South Africa.

Habitat

Description
In his original description Gough described A. duerdeni as being cream-colored above and below, referring to a faded specimen stored in alcohol. In life A. duerdeni is uniformly blackish-brown or gray dorsally, and it is white or creamish-pink ventrally. The dorsal scales are in 21 rows at midbody. The ventrals number 199; the anal is entire; and the subcaudals number 22, all except the first entire. The snout is prominent and subcuneiform. The rostral has a rounded horizontal edge, and the portion visible from above is a little longer than its distance from the frontal.

Behavior
A. duerdeni is fossorial.

Diet
A. duerdeni preys upon sleeping lizards and snakes.

Reproduction
A. duerdeni is oviparous.

Venom
A venomous species, A. duerdeni can inflict a serious bite requiring medical attention, but no human fatality has been recorded.

References

Further reading
Branch, Bill (2004). Field Guide to Snakes and other Reptiles of Southern Africa. Third Revised edition, Second impression. Sanibel Island, Florida: Ralph Curtis Books. 399 pp. . (Atractaspis duerdeni, p. 63 + Plate 38).
Broadley, Donald G.; Blaylock, Roger (2013). The Snakes of Zimbabwe and Botswana. Frankfurt am Main, Germany: Edition Chimaira / Serpents Tale. 387 pp. .
Herrmann, Hans-Werner; Branch, Bill (2013). "Fifty years of herpetological research in the Namib Desert and Namibia with an updated and annotated species checklist". Journal of Arid Environments 93: 94–115.
Schleicher, Alfred (2020). Reptiles of Namibia. Windhoek, Namibia: Kuiseb Publishers. 271 pp. .

External Links
 iNaturalist page

Lamprophiidae
Reptiles described in 1907